Michal Ondo (born 20 February 1985), nicknamed Máchal, is a Czech professional darts player and a member of the team Barbaři Sedlec.

Career 

Michal started playing in 2001 and he belongs to the best and most successful Czech players.

In soft-tip darts he is fourth times National champion in teams and in 2017 he dominated the tournament in singles.

His first successful year in steel darts came in 2011, in which he made three big achievements. He became National champion in singles and also started to compete abroad, finishing 3rd in Hungaria Open and Vienna Open. In 2012 he became National champion in teams with DC Bizoni. In 2014 he finished 3rd in Romania Open. In the same year he won in Czech Cup and in the National championship in doubles. In 2015 he triumphed again in Czech Cup and he managed to win doubles tournament on the biggest darts tournament in Czech republic – Czech Open. Following year, 2016, he won Czech Cup for the third time and he repeated the 3rd place from Hungaria Open as well.

Between 2011 and 2017 he attempted to qualify for BDO World Darts Championship, but never succeeded. He took part in six major tournaments, World Masters, making it into last 48 in 2015.

In 2018, he finished 3rd in WDF Europe Cup which is probably his big achievement so far. In the same year, he became National champion with the team Barbaři Sedlec. In November he took part in the exhibition Prague Darts Masters and he played against Peter Wright.

In 2019 he won National championship in doubles for the third time, this year with Michal Šmejda. He also competed in PDC European Q-school 2019, three times making in into last 128 and last 64 in the last tournament. In November he qualified for another exhibition, Prague Darts Master Souboj legend, where also Phil Taylor played.

In 2020 he tried PDC European Q-school again, making it into last 32 on Day 3. The other days he was eliminated in last 512, last 256 and last 128, which was not enough to secure the Tour card. In April 2020 he became one of the ten players of newly found 2020 Tipsport Premier League.

Major tournaments results 

WDF

BDO

References

External links

1985 births
Living people
Czech darts players
Professional Darts Corporation associate players
People from Vysoké Mýto
Sportspeople from the Pardubice Region